The Bedford TJ is a truck that was produced by Bedford and their successors from 1958 to 1998, as a replacement for the earlier Bedford A series of medium-duty trucks that were produced between 1953 and 1958. The truck was the last bonneted truck produced by the company, and the last vehicle to be produced to have a relation with Bedford Vehicles.

History
Production of the Bedford TJ began in 1958 as the company's new bonneted truck model, and was a modernised version of the Bedford TD series, modeled after the Advanced Design US truck. The TJ truck was produced in many versions, including light pickups to heavy-duty vehicles, with payloads up to 6-8 tons. Unfortunately, due to their relatively dated styling, and presumably since bonneted trucks were falling out of favor these years, the TJ series was not very popular in the UK, and did not sold in big numbers, with the exception of the AA and Post Office Telephones, Holland's Pies in Lancashire used a large fleet of TJ vans well into the 1980s, notable for being kept in very clean condition, and the TJ was often called a 'Holland's pie van' around Lancashire.

The lightest versions (J0) shared the same petrol engine as the Vauxhall Cresta, which offered relatively good performance, although it could not cope very well with loads over 800-900 kg. Heavier variants used the same engine as on the Bedford TD series. In export markets, specifically in countries such as India, Pakistan, and other developing countries, the TJ sold in great numbers, due to its reliability and relatively low price, compared to the competition. In 1975, the TJ was withdrawn from the UK market, and marked Bedford's last vehicle into the segment. The J0 and J1 pickup trucks and vans were replaced by the Bedford CF vans, but the heavy-duty versions (J2 and up) were left without a successor.

After 1975, the TJ was offered only for export, where it was pretty successful, however, during the 1980s, exports to countries such as Australia and New Zealand stopped, since it was clear that these trucks were very outdated, and couldn't compete in the market anymore, nevertheless, it continued production for export to developing countries. After 1986, the Dunstable plant was sold to David J.B. Brown and became AWD Trucks.  Production of the TJ continued under the AWD Bedford badge. After Marshall SPV purchased AWD Trucks, they continued producing the TJ series, but in limited numbers. The last TJ trucks were built in 1998, when an order was placed for 100 trucks to be exported to Kenya.

Pakistan
In Pakistan, the J5/6 is very popular and dominated commercial vehicular traffic. It has a cult status among drivers and is known for its power, reliability, and durability. Over 50% of the trucks in Pakistan are Bedford vehicles.

India
An Indian company, Hindustan Motors, also produced the larger versions (J5/6) of the vehicle in that country from 1968, production lasted until 1995 when the vehicle proved to be unable to compete with Tata and Ashok Leyland vehicles.

Australia
The TJ was widely exported. In Australia they were distributed by GM-Holden.

Malaysia
Bedford TJ trucks were also produced in Malaysia from knock-down kits, until the late 1970s, when Bedford vehicles generally fell out of favor there, and GM focused more on promoting Isuzu on that market. There, the TJ trucks were replaced by the Isuzu TX trucks.

Models
J0 (often referred to as JO)
J1
J2
J3
J4
J5
J6

Chassis codes

1958 To June 1967
J1 30cwt.
J2S 3ton.
J2L 3ton. (GVM - 5ton)
J2LC 3ton (GVM - 4.5ton)
J3L 4ton.
J4L 5ton.
J4E 5ton.
J4A 8ton tractor.
J5S 6ton.
J5L 6ton.
J6S 7ton.
J6L 7ton.

A 3rd or 4th number indicates engine type;

1 = 300cu. in Diesel
2 = 214cu. in Gasoline
3 = 300cu. in Gasoline
5 = 330cu. in Diesel
7 = 200cu. in Diesel
10 =220cu. in Diesel

July 1967 onwards
Chassis codes changed in July 1967 to ensure Bedford complied with new legislation introduced in the UK (Construction and Use Regulations).

CDD/CHD 30cwt.
CDJ/CHJ 3ton.
CDL/CHL 4ton.
CFM/CJM 5ton.
CFN/CJN 6ton.
CFQ/CJQ 7 ton.

The 2nd letter indicates engine type;

D = 214cu. in Gasoline
F =3 00cu. in Gasoline
H = 220cu. in Diesel
J = 330cu. in Diesel

Engines
The engines available included:

 214cu Gasoline
 300cu Gasoline
 300cu Diesel
 330cu Diesel
 200cu Diesel
 220cu Diesel

Gallery

See also
 Customised buses and trucks in Pakistan

References

External links
 Enthusiast site
 Bedford Trucks in Portugal 

TJ
Road transport in Pakistan
Vans